God Told Me To (released in some theatrical markets as Demon) is a 1976 science fiction horror film written, directed, and produced by Larry Cohen. Like many of Cohen's films, it is shot on location in New York City and incorporates aspects of the police procedural.

Plot 
In New York City, a gunman perched atop a water tower, opens fire with a .22 caliber rifle on the crowded streets below, randomly killing fifteen pedestrians. Peter Nicholas, a devout Catholic NYPD detective, climbs the tower to talk to the sniper. Before jumping to his death, the gunman tells Nicholas that "God told" him to commit the murders.

Although traumatized by the attack, Nicholas investigates a series of seemingly unpremeditated murders that follow: a mass stabbing at a supermarket, a mass shooting by a police officer at a St. Patrick's Day parade, and a man who murders his wife and children. They have all been committed by a variety of unconnected, seemingly normal assailants who claim that God told them to kill. Nicholas learns that one of the murderers knew a long-haired young man named Bernard Phillips. When Nicholas visits Phillips' address, Phillips' mother assaults Nicholas with a knife, but she dies during the attack by falling down a flight of stairs. She turns out to have been a virgin and to have once claimed she was abducted by aliens. Nicholas' superiors refuse to acknowledge a religious motivation for the murders and suspend him, so he leaks this story to the press, causing a panic. A corrupt high-level NYPD officer is stabbed to death by Zero, a gangster he had betrayed. Zero disguises the murder as one of the "God" killings; however, Nicholas correctly deduces that it is a cover for a non-connected murder, noting that the previous killers all remained where they committed their crimes and accepted being arrested or shot (or committing suicide) after confessing that "God told them to" commit the atrocities.

A group of wealthy religious cultists are in thrall to Bernard Phillips and are aware that Phillips is influencing the murderers as he contacts and controls them via psychic powers while informing them of each impending atrocity. Phillips has one of the members invite Nicholas to join them, but when Nicholas asks whether the follower knows about Phillips' mother, the follower suffers convulsions and drops dead. Another cult member attempts to kill Nicholas by pushing him in front of a subway train, but when he fails, Nicholas forces him to take him to Phillips, who isolates himself in a fiery furnace room deep underground. After delivering Nicholas, the follower decapitates himself using an elevator. A brief meeting convinces Nicholas that he himself is special and that Phillips does not kill him as he needs him for some purpose.

By researching his own adoption records, Nicholas finds an old woman who seems to be his birth mother. She explains that she gave up her out-of-wedlock child after she was brutally impregnated by a strange ball of light while she walked home from the New York Worlds Fair in 1941. The meeting distresses both of them, and Nicholas is wracked with doubt over who or what he is. He realizes that he too has psychic powers, which he uses to confront and kill Zero. 

Nicholas confronts Phillips one last time and discovers the truth: both he and Phillips are the result of "virgin births" caused by a mysterious extraterrestrial "entity of light" with psychic/supernatural powers and advanced spacecraft technology. Nicholas' human genes are dominant, which is why he is unaware of his true nature, while Phillips is more like their unseen progenitor. Phillips reveals himself to be a hermaphrodite who wishes to spawn a new species with his "brother." Nicholas refuses and attacks Phillips, whose powers cause the building they are in to collapse. Nicholas manages to escape the scene but Phillips is killed. Nicholas is arrested for the murder of Phillips. As he is led into court by police, a news reporter asks him why he committed the crime. He responds, "God told me to." Nicholas is committed to the Matteawan State Hospital for the Criminally Insane.

Cast
 Tony Lo Bianco as Lieutenant Peter J. Nicholas
 Deborah Raffin as Casey Forster
 Sandy Dennis as Martha Nicholas
 Sylvia Sidney as Elizabeth Mullin
 Sam Levene as Everett Lukas
 Robert Drivas as David Morten
 Mike Kellin as Deputy Commissioner
 Richard Lynch as Bernard Phillips
 Sammy Williams as Harold Gorman
 George Patterson as Zero
 Harry Bellaver as "Cookie"
 Andy Kaufman as Police Assassin

Production 
Cohen was inspired to make the film by the Bible. He thought God in the Bible was one of the most violent characters in literature. He was also influenced by the book Chariots of the Gods.

The film was financed by Edgar Scherick and Daniel Blatt. They were originally credited as executive producers but Cohen says when they saw the finished film they insisted their names be taken off it.

Robert Forster was originally cast in the lead role. A few days into filming he and Cohen had a falling out and Forster quit. Forster said Cohen "was one of those guys who yelled a lot on the set, and I said, "Hey, this isn't for me. Let me out of here." We parted friendly and all that." Cohen replaced him with Tony Lo Bianco, who had been in Cohen's play The Nature of the Crime.

Bernard Herrmann, who had scored Cohen's earlier film It's Alive, was originally assigned to score God Told Me To as well, and Cohen claims on the DVD commentary track that Herrmann saw the first cut of the film immediately after completing the recording sessions for his score to Taxi Driver and made notes on how he believed it could be scored. However, within the next 15 hours, Herrmann died.  Cohen then asked composer Miklós Rózsa to score the film.  Rózsa turned it down, saying "God told me not to". Frank Cordell composed the score heard in the released version of God Told Me To, and both it and Taxi Driver were dedicated to Herrmann. Composer Robert O. Ragland who later scored Cohen's 1982 film Q wrote two of the songs for the film.

The 'alien abduction' sequence, where a naked woman is drawn up into the cavernous interior of an extraterrestrial spacecraft, features (manipulated) generic stock model footage from Gerry Anderson's science fiction TV series Space: 1999.

Andy Kaufman appears as a possessed policeman who goes on a shooting rampage at the Saint Patrick's Day parade — it was Kaufman's first role in any film, and the same footage was later used for the finale of a documentary called The Passion of Andy Kaufman, in a segment called "Thus Spake Zarathustra", with music by Eumir Deodato. Sylvia Sidney appears as Detective Nicholas's long-lost, traumatized mother in a nursing home.

Release 
The film was sold to New World Pictures. It did not perform well on original release so it was re-issued under the title of Demon.

Reception 

Initial reviews were negative, with Roger Ebert giving the film 1 out of 4. The film has since been reappraised, with Rolling Stone naming it one of the "20 Scariest Films You've Never Seen".

In the early 2010s, Time Out conducted a poll with several authors, directors, actors and critics who have worked within the horror genre to vote for their top horror films. God Told Me To placed at number 94 on their top 100 list.

References 
Citations

Sources

External links 
 
 
 
 
 
 Gold Told Me To at TCMDB
 Larry Cohen on God Told Me To at Trailers from Hell
 Mick Garris on God Told Me To at Trailers from Hell

1976 films
1970s supernatural horror films
1976 horror films
Religious horror films
American supernatural horror films
Films set in New York City
1970s English-language films
Films about ancient astronauts
Films directed by Larry Cohen
Occult detective fiction
1970s science fiction horror films
American science fiction horror films
New World Pictures films
Films with screenplays by Larry Cohen
1970s American films